Helodranon' Antongila (Bay of Antongila), more commonly called Antongil Bay in English, is the largest bay in Madagascar.  This bay is on the island's east coast, toward the northern end of the eastern coastline of the island. It is within Analanjirofo administrative region.

Forming the eastern edge of the bay is the Masoala peninsula. The island Nosy Mangabe and the town of Maroantsetra are situated at the northern end of the bay, while the southern end of the bay is near the site of the town of Mananara Avaratra and the mouth of the Mananara River (Analanjirofo).

Bays of Madagascar
Analanjirofo
Pirate dens and locations